Silent Witness is a 1985 American television film starring Valerie Bertinelli and John Savage, directed by Michael Miller. It premiered on October 14, 1985 on NBC and is based on a true rape case in Massachusetts, the Cheryl Araujo case.

Plot 
Anna and Kevin Dunne are a newlywed couple who have recently moved to Pittsburgh. She is working in a discount department store, he is a garbage man. She leads a very happy life, until one night she, along with her husband, witnesses the kidnapping and rape of Patti Mullen from a bar. To her shock, she recognizes Michael, her brother-in-law, as one of the three kidnapper-rapists. The following days, Anna is dealing with a great dilemma. On the one hand, she sympathizes with Patti, a mentally unstable alcoholic who depends on witnesses, and she wants the rapists to be punished. On the other hand, she knows testifying against her brother-in-law will ruin the very close Dunne family.

Kevin advises Anna to remain quiet, which she initially does. She does visit Patti, though, who does not remember the kidnap-rape completely. Anna admits to her about the rape, after which Patti presses charges. Kevin and Anna avoid being summoned to testify, which puts a great deal of feeling guilt on Anna's shoulders. She knows that Patti, because of her alcoholic background, can rely only on Anna. During the highly publicized trial, Michael's lawyer Huffman does not have any trouble proving Patti is unreliable. Not much later, it is revealed Patti has committed suicide.

Now feeling extremely guilty, Anna is finally ready to testify. When Kevin tries to prevent her from doing so, she decides to leave him, telling him the case is driving them apart. Soon after the testimony, the Dunne family, with the exception of Kevin, starts committing perjury, telling in court Anna is holding a grudge against them for being teased because she, unlike Jean Dunne, hasn't ever got pregnant. They claim Kevin had an affair with a co-worker. They try to convince the judges that Anna's testimony is false and that she is only trying to take revenge against the family.

One night, Anna receives a visit from Joey Caputo, an old friend who left the bar shortly before the kidnapping and rape occurred. They have sex that night and the next day, Joey gives a false testimony in which he claims that Anna only cares about the publicity. Kevin notices how his relatives are destroying Anna and finally decides to denounce his family. He tries to convince Anna to run away with him, but she is determined to stay to serve justice. She goes back on stand, but once again, the defense is able to twist her words. In the end, Kevin comes to the rescue, finally giving a testimony. Afterwards, Anna and Kevin are reunited.

Cast
 Valerie Bertinelli as Anna Abbatieri-Dunne
 John Savage as Kevin Dunne
Chris Nash as Michael Dunne
 Melissa Leo as Patti Mullen
 Pat Corley as Brad Huffman
 Steven Williams as Ted Gunning
 Jacqueline Brookes as Ma Dunne
 Alex McArthur as Joey Caputo
Katie McCombs as Jean Dunne
Tom Signorelli as Detective Pileggi
Billy Elmer(actor) as Carl Englehardt

See also
 List of American films of 1985

External links

References

1985 television films
1985 films
American crime drama films
American rape and revenge films
Crime films based on actual events
NBC network original films
Films scored by Michael Hoenig
Films directed by Michael Miller (director)
1980s American films